The Alliance for Progressives is a social-liberal political party in Botswana.

History
In July 2017 the Botswana Movement for Democracy (BMD) president Ndaba Gaolathe and five other members of the party's executive were expelled from the party. As a result, Gaolathe set up a new leadership committee, which was later transformed into a breakaway party, the Alliance for Progressives. The new party was formally established on 28 October 2017 with Gaolathe as leader and Wynter Mmolotsi as deputy president. Six sitting MPs joined the party, although Haskins Nkaigwa later returned to the UDC, leaving it with five seats going into the 2019 general elections.

The elections saw the party receive 4.75% of the vote, finishing third behind the Botswana Democratic Party and the Umbrella for Democratic Change. However, it only retained a single seat, with Mmolotsi winning in Francistown South.

References

Political parties in Botswana
2017 establishments in Botswana
Political parties established in 2017
Liberal parties in Africa